Gopi Krishna  may refer to:

 Gopi Krishna (yogi)  (1903–1984), Indian yogi, social reformer and writer
 V. Gopi Krishna (died 1980), cinematographer
 Gopi Krishna (dancer) (1935–1994), Indian dancer and choreographer
 Gopi Krishna (film editor) (born 1985), Indian film editor
 Gopi Krishna (film), a 1992 Indian Kannada romantic comedy film

Krishna, Gopi